Microstomia is a small mouth (micro- a combining form meaning small + -stomia a combining form meaning mouth = (abnormally) "small mouth" in Greek.)

Congenital 
It is a feature of many craniofacial syndromes, including Freeman–Sheldon syndrome and Sheldon-Hall syndromes (or distal arthrogryposis multiplex congenita). It may present with whistling-face feature, as well, as in Freeman-Sheldon syndrome. In this syndrome, it impairs alimentation and may require repeated oral surgeries (called commissurotomy) to improve function.

Acquired 
Microstomia can occur as a result of scarring due to many conditions. It is seen as complication of facial burns.
It can also be a feature of systemic scleroderma.

References

External links 

Congenital disorders of eye, ear, face and neck